Arthur Jarrett may refer to:

Arthur L. Jarrett (1884–1960), American screenwriter and film actor
Art Jarrett (1907–1987), his son, American singer, actor and bandleader
Arthur William Jarrett (1874–1942), pioneer radio broadcaster in South Australia